This is a list of Swedish coastal defence ships of the period 1859-1918:
They are commonly but incorrectly called "coast defence battleships" in many sources. They were listed in the 1938 edition of Jane's Fighting Ships as battleships, though they were not designed as such, nor capable of fighting true battleships one on one.

  (1886) - Stricken 1945
  (1891)
 

  (1897)
  (1899)
 

  (1900) - Converted to an Aircraft Tender and Depot Ship prior to 1938

  (1901) - Stricken 1947
  (1901)
  (1901) - BU 1952
  (1903)

  (1905) - BU 1974

  (1915)
  (1917)
  (1918)

Gallery

 
Coastal defence ships
Coastal defence ships list